The 15th season of the FA Women's Premier League.

National Division

Top scorers

Northern Division

Southern Division

References
Soccerway table

Eng
FA Women's National League seasons
Wom
1